Foued Hadded (born 1 November 1990) is an Algerian footballer who plays for DRB Tadjenanet as a midfielder.

References

External links

1990 births
Living people
Association football midfielders
Algerian footballers
DRB Tadjenanet players
21st-century Algerian people